Tales from the Cryptic is an album by accordionist Guy Klucevsek with saxophonist Phillip Johnston which was recorded in 2002 and released on the Winter & Winter label.

Reception

In his review for Allmusic, Thom Jurek said that "This is a breathtaking recording, full of humor, warmth, tenderness, and plenty of instrumental fire that feels more like a live performance than a studio recording. Highly recommended". In JazzTimes, Aaron Steinberg observed "The two players stroll through winsome ballads, spirited dances and dark, carnivalesque themes while claiming liberties and creative detours that hardly jeopardize the balance of these modestly scaled pieces. They jump in and out of structured passages with grace, inject the music with tartness and just as convincingly (and with only the slightest hints of tongue-in-cheek) navigate the sweetest of melodies".

Track listing
All compositions by Guy Klucevsek except as indicated
 "Spin Cycle" - 4:20
 "Tulips Are Better Than One" - 3:44
 "Am-Scray" (Phillip Johnston) - 4:38
 "The Gift" - 5:26    
 "Trial By Error" (Johnston) - 3:32
 "Petite Ouverture a Danser" (Erik Satie) - 2:13
 "A Pear for Satie" - 4:28
 "Slippin' on a Star" (Johnston) - 4:56
 "No More Mr. Nice Guy" - 5:21
 "Der Leiermann" (Franz Schubert) - 3:07    
 "Diggin' Bones" (Johnston) - 4:36
 "A Goyish Kind of Blue" - 4:51
 "The Road to Woy Woy" (Johnston) - 4:22
 "The Needless Kiss" (Johnston) - 4:40
 "Blue Window" - 3:50

Personnel
Guy Klucevsek - accordion
Phillip Johnston - soprano saxophone, alto saxophone

References

Winter & Winter Records albums
Guy Klucevsek albums
Phillip Johnston albums
2003 albums